Sous Lieutenant René Pierre Marie Dorme (30 January 1894 – 25 May 1917), Légion d'honneur, Médaille militaire, Croix de Guerre was a French World War I fighter ace credited with at least confirmed 23 victories.

Biography
René Pierre Marie Dorme was born in Abaucourt les Souppleville, France on 30 January 1894. 

He joined the military in 1913, and was serving as a cannoneer in Tunisia, North Africa when World War I erupted. Requesting transfer to aviation duty, he began training as an aerial observer on 1 February 1915. On the 13th, those orders were changed to ship him to pilot training. On 6 May 1915, he graduated with his Military Pilot's Brevet. After advanced schooling, he was posted to Escadrille 94 on 5 June 1915.

He was injured in a crash before he saw action. He did not get into combat until March 1916. He was posted to Escadrille 3 to fly Nieuport fighters in June 1916. Although he would later change from his Nieuport 17 to a SPAD VII, in both cases he adorned his aircraft with a Cross of Lorraine on the upper deck, the numeral '12' accompanying a stork on the fuselage, and the nickname 'Papa Dorne' on the side of the cockpit.

Dorme would score 23 confirmed victories between July 1916 and May 1917, with approximately the same number of combat claims unconfirmed.

During this victory string, Dorme was awarded the Médaille Militaire on 4 August 1916, and the Legion d'honneur on 18 October 1916. He was gravely wounded in action on 20 December 1916. While in hospital recuperating, he was commissioned as a Sous lieutenant on 23 January 1917. He returned to flying duty on 1 March 1917. He died in combat on 25 May 1917, being shot down by Heinrich Kroll of Jagdstaffel 9. Kroll, who was flying an Albatros D.III, noted in his diary that Dorme had fought from 5300 meters down to 800 meters before diving to earth and bursting into fire. Kroll also noted that Dorme was identified by his watch being on his remains.

Dorme had 23 aerial victories officially confirmed. Unconfirmed claims amount to 19 more listings. Dorme was notoriously lax in filing combat claims, sometimes only doing so when prompted by wingmates. The haphazardness of his victory list has led to speculation that he scored as many as 43 victories, or perhaps even 70 victories.

Honors and awards
Médaille Militaire Citation:
Pilot of remarkable skill, sang-froid, and audacity. Has accomplished numerous flights at night under the most difficult and dangerous conditions. Has had ten aerial combats during the course of which he downed an enemy plane on 3 April, and a second one on 9 Jul 1916. The latter within fifteen kilometers of French lines. Already wounded and cited in orders.

Legion d'honneur Citation:
Brilliant pursuit pilot. Has exceptional knowledge and audacity. Always ready at all times and in all circumstances to carry out the boldest of missions. Has accomplished superb reconnaissances and downed thirteen enemy planes. Has the Médaille Militaire and five citations in army orders.

Inline citations

References

 Franks, Norman (2000). Nieuport Aces of World War 1. Oxford UK: Osprey Publishing. , .
  Franks, Norman; Bailey, Frank (1993). Over the Front: The Complete Record of the Fighter Aces and Units of the United States and French Air Services, 1914–1918. London, UK: Grub Street Publishing. .
 Gutmann, Jon (2001). SPAD VII Aces of World War I. Oxford, UK:Osprey Publishing.

External links

(fr) Biography, color profiles of his planes and list of victories

1894 births
1917 deaths
French World War I flying aces
French military personnel killed in World War I